Edward Charles Bowers (December 15, 1845 – January 19, 1929) was a politician, teacher and trader. Born in Westport, Colony of Nova Scotia, he was elected to the House of Commons of Canada in 1891 as a Member of the Liberal Party to represent the riding of Digby. He was acclaimed in 1892.

External links
 

1845 births
1929 deaths
Liberal Party of Canada MPs
Members of the House of Commons of Canada from Nova Scotia
Place of death missing